Kawass Airport  is an airport serving  Port Kamsar on the Atlantic coast of Guinea.

See also
Transport in Guinea
List of airports in Guinea

References

External links
 OpenStreetMap - Kawass Airport
 SkyVector - Kamsar/Kawass Airport
 OurAirports - Kawass Airport
 FallingRain -Kawass Airport

Airports in Guinea